The parent metallacyclobenzene has the formula LnM(CH)5. They can be viewed as derivatives of benzene wherein a CH center has been replaced by a transition metal complex.  Most metallabenzenes do not feature the M(CH)5 ring itself, but, instead, some of the H atoms are replaced by other substituents.

Classification
Metallabenzene complexes have been classified into three varieties; in such compounds, the parent acyclic hydrocarbon ligand is viewed as the anion C5H5−. The 6 π electrons in the metallacycle conform to the Hückel (4n+2) theory.

Preparation and structure
The first reported stable metallabenzene was the osmabenzene Os(C5H4S)CO(PPh3)2. Characteristic of other metallaarenes, the Os-C bonds are about 0.6 Å longer than the C-C bonds (in benzene these are 1.39 Å), resulting in a distortion of the hexagonal ring. 1H NMR signals for the ring protons are downfield, consistent with aromatic "ring current." Osmabenzene and its derivatives can be regarded as an Os(II), d6 octahedral complex.

Metallabenzenes have been also been characterized with metals ruthenium, iridium, platinum, and rhenium.

References

Organometallic chemistry
Cyclic compounds